Courbefy is a hamlet in the Bussière-Galant commune in the Haute-Vienne department of the Nouvelle-Aquitaine region in western France.

Yoo had seen it on CNN, and wanted to set up an "environmental, artistic and cultural" project in the village.

Geography 

The village occupies a vaguely oval space and is totally surrounded by woods, with the exception of the southern part.

History 

The village of Courbefy initially had a medieval royal fortress, but it became a den of thieves, and the castle was destroyed in the sixteenth century by order of the consuls of Limoges.

During the French Revolution, Courbefy was a separate municipality. It merged in 1800 with Saint-Nicolas to form Saint-Nicolas-Courbefy. Bussière-Galant absorbed Saint-Nicolas-Courbefy in 1974.

In the late twentieth century and early twenty-first century, the last resident of Courbefy bought one by one all the houses and lands of the village, after having built a hotel and restaurant in the 1990s. In 2008 he went bankrupt and left the village. In February 2012, a judicial procedure assigned his property to a creditor bank, which then put the whole hamlet up for auction.

Monuments 

A small chapel of the seventeenth century lies a few dozen meters from the old dungeon.

Courbefy has three holy wells located a few hundred meters from the chapel. One of them is still used as evidenced by the numerous offerings of pieces of cloth, children's shoes or diapers. They seem to be dedicated to Saint Eutropius.

Image gallery

References 

Geography of Haute-Vienne
Villages in Nouvelle-Aquitaine